Music for the People is the debut studio album by American hip hop group Marky Mark and the Funky Bunch, released on July 23, 1991. The album was a success, reaching #1 on the Top Heatseekers Albums chart, and #21 on the Billboard 200, thanks to the hit single, "Good Vibrations". Alongside "Good Vibrations", the album spawned an additional top-ten single, "Wildside" (#10 on the Billboard Hot 100) and the minor hit "I Need Money". The album was certified platinum by the RIAA on January 14, 1992. "Good Vibrations" was Marky Mark and the Funky Bunch's first single, and after its release it went to number one on the U.S. Billboard Hot 100 chart. The song, and most of the album, was produced by Mark Wahlberg's brother, Donnie Wahlberg, who is part of the group New Kids on the Block.

Background 
Before the group was even formed, Mark Wahlberg, who was the lead singer, was in jail for beating a Vietnamese man.  Even before Mark got arrested, he dropped out of school at the age of 14 and began hustling, stealing, and selling drugs.  Once Mark got out of prison, his older brother Donnie helped him out by getting him involved in the music business.  Mark wasn't the best singer, but with his charisma and looks, Donnie helped him and his group debut their first album.  In 1990, Donnie Walhberg convinced younger brother Mark to return to the music scene as Marky Mark and the Funky Bunch, even landing them a spot as opening act for Donnie's band New Kids on the Block. Mark Walhberg (Marky Mark) was joined by an all black ensemble including Scott Ross (aka Scottie Gee), Hector Barros (Hector the Booty Inspector), Anthony Thomas (Ashley Ace), and Terry Yancey (DJ-T) to create more of a "street" feel for Mark. The following year Donnie went a step further, producing the group's first and most successful album, Music for the People.

Reception
Music for the People released on July 23, 1991, to mixed reviews. Despite being lauded more for Mark's physique and charisma than musicality, the album still managed to receive a Platinum certification from the Recording Industry Association of America. 

James Muretich from Calgary Herald wrote, "...this is all right. The breast-beating bravado is as good as anybody`s, the groove is always good 'n' funky and the tune "Wildside" smartly samples Lou Reed's "Walk on the Wild Side" while using effective street imagery. Yeah, Marky, the Wahlberg with the biceps, actually delivers the goods." MTV's Jason Ankeny said, that "Rap purists were appalled by Wahlberg's mediocre lyrical skills, lame samples, and tired beats." Perry Gettelman from Orlando Sentinel felt the songs on the album "are serviceable enough pop-rap." In an interview with Oral Tradition, DJ Romeo told that he believes Marky Mark’s disjointed rhythm and rap cadence comes primarily from reading the rap from paper while recording, and that while some rappers use “poets tools,” (simile, hyperbole, and alliteration) Marky Mark “just raps.” 

The album was the only real successful thing that the group accomplished with its two big hits "Good Vibrations" and "Wildside". The group started to tank a couple years after their platinum album and split up in 1993 when Mark Wahlberg decided to take his career in another direction by starting to act.

Track listing

 signifies a co-producer

Personnel
Adapted credits from the media notes of Music for the People.
Leo Okeke: chief engineer, keyboards, bass, Macintosh Protracks programming, digital sampling
Donnie Wahlberg: drum programming, Macintosh Protracks programming, digital sampling
Mary Alford: mixing
Ted Jensen: mastering (Sterling Sound)
D.J. Terry Yancey: scratches
Jeff Dovner, Randy Melton: engineering
Tom Soares: mix engineering
Joe Pires, Jamie Locke: assistant mix engineering
Chuck Reed: A&R coordinator

Charts and certifications

Charts

Certifications
 RIAA – Platinum

References

Mark Wahlberg albums
1991 debut albums
Interscope Records albums
Atlantic Records albums